William Charles Arcedeckne Vanneck, 5th Baron Huntingfield,  (3 January 1883 – 20 November 1969) was a British Conservative Party politician, Governor of Victoria, and Administrator of Australia.  He was the first Australian-born governor of an Australian state.

Early life
Born in Gatton, Queensland, Vanneck was the son of Hon. William Arcedeckne Vanneck and Mary Armstrong, sister of William Drayton Armstrong (a Member of the Queensland Legislative Assembly and its Speaker for many years). Vanneck grew up near Gatton (now the modern locality of Adare) until he was 14 years old when he went to England. He was educated at Wellington College, Berkshire, whereafter he joined the 13th/18th Hussars, reaching the rank of captain. He succeeded his uncle in 1915 as the 5th Baron Huntingfield of Heveningham Hall and 7th Baronet Vanneck of Putney.

Vanneck married on 21 December 1912 American-born Margaret Eleanor Crosby, the daughter of Ernest Howard Crosby, a descendant of Declaration of Independence signer William Floyd, and Fanny Kendall Schieffelin. From her paternal grandmother Margaret Evertson Givan, Crosby was descendant from Dutch, French Canadian and Scandinavian ancestors who settled in North America.

They had four children:
Hon. Sara Carola Vanneck (25 September 1913 – 2001), married Major David Arthur Peel in Melbourne, Australia on 14 April 1936. He was a grandson of Arthur Peel, 1st Viscount Peel and died in action in the Second World War in September 1944. 
Gerald Vanneck, 6th Baron Huntingfield (1915–1994)
Hon. Anne Margaret Theodosia Vanneck (20 May 1918 – 2000), married Peter Moro, the architect, on 2 March 1940 and had issue; divorced in 1984.
Hon. Sir Peter Vanneck (1922–1999)

Political career
Between 1923 and 1929 Vanneck was member for Eye, Suffolk in the Parliament of the United Kingdom. He was successively Parliamentary Private Secretary to the Parliamentary Under-Secretary of the Home Office 1926–27, and then to the President of the Board of Trade between 1927 and 1928.

Governorships
In 1934 Huntingfield became the Governor of Victoria, Australia, being the first Australian-born governor of an Australian state (although he was always considered British). (Despite this, Victoria was the last of the states to appoint an Australian as governor, Sir Henry Winneke in 1974.) His term expired in 1939. He served as Administrator of Australia between March and September 1938.

Although Vanneck was offered the post of Governor of Southern Rhodesia in 1942, he did not take up the position due to ill health.

Freemasonry
Vanneck was a freemason. He was initiated to the craft in 1919, in the United Lodge No. 1629. He became a member of the United Service Lodge No. 330 in Victoria as a Past Master in 1934. Shortly after that, in 1935, he became Grand Master of the Grand Lodge of Victoria. After his return to England, in 1940, he was appointed Senior Grand Warden of the United Grand Lodge of England.

Honours and later life
Vanneck was invested as a Knight Commander of the Order of St Michael and St George in 1934. He was Colonel of the 58th Battalion, Company of London Home Guard during the Second World War. He was given the rank of Honorary Air Commodore in No. 21 (City of Melbourne) Squadron, Royal Australian Air Force. Finally, he was invested as a Knight of Grace Order of St. John of Jerusalem.

References

External links
 

Huntingfield, William Vanneck, 5th Baron
Huntingfield, William Vanneck, 5th Baron
Huntingfield, William Vanneck, 5th Baron
Huntingfield, William Vanneck, 5th Baron
Huntingfield, William Vanneck, 5th Baron
Huntingfield, William Vanneck, 5th Baron
Huntingfield, William Vanneck, 5th Baron
Huntingfield, William Vanneck, 5th Baron
Military personnel from Queensland
British Freemasons
Conservative Party (UK) MPs for English constituencies
UK MPs 1923–1924
UK MPs 1924–1929
Huntingfield, William Vanneck, 5th Baron
Honorary air commodores of the Royal Australian Air Force
Australian Freemasons
Masonic Grand Masters
William